Ászár is a village in Komárom-Esztergom county, Hungary. Ászár has approximately 1,645 inhabitants and has had its own independent local council since January 2003.

There are a wide range of visitor attractions such as the Saliházi forest, the natural lake along the Saliházi ditch, the Roman Catholic Church, the tombstone of Petrus Kulinger, and the Lutheran Church. Ászár is also a part of the Ászár-Bársonyos historical wine region.

External links
 Street map (Hungarian)

References

Populated places in Komárom-Esztergom County